Șeica Mică is a commune located in Sibiu County, Transylvania, Romania. It is composed of two villages, Soroștin (Schorsten; Sorostély) and Șeica Mică.

Tourism 
 the fortified church of Șeica Mică
 mud volcanos of Soroștin

References

Communes in Sibiu County
Localities in Transylvania